The Doctor of Business Administration (DBA) is primarily a research doctorate but may be a professional doctorate, depending on the granting university, awarded on the basis of advanced study, examinations, project work, and research in business administration. The DBA is a terminal degree in business administration. Some universities also combine the business administration field with technology-related disciplines. Along with the PhD or DPhil, it represents the highest academic qualification in business administration, and is typically required to gain employment as a full-time, tenure-track university professor or postdoctoral researcher in the field. As with other earned doctorates, individuals with the degree are awarded the academic title doctor, which is often represented via the English honorific "Dr." or the post-nominal letters "DBA" or "DrBA." However, in the United States, DBA degree holders often use the social form of Dr. First Last name in professional email signatures and professional correspondence. In a healthcare setting amongst medical doctors MD, DBA degree holders are also referred to as Dr. First Last name.

DBA candidates submit a significant project, typically referred to as a thesis, capstone project, or dissertation, consisting of a body of original academic research that is in principle worthy of publication in a peer-reviewed journal. Candidates must defend this work before a panel of expert examiners called a thesis, dissertation, or doctoral committee.

In the United States, the Doctor of Business Administration is recognized by the National Science Foundation (NSF) as a research degree. The DBA is also considered by both the United States Department of Education and the National Science Foundation to be equivalent to the more commonly awarded PhD.

In Canada, the Doctor of Business Administration is recognized as a terminal degree in business administration / management. The DBA qualifies as a full academic doctorates in Canada though they normally incorporate aspects of professional practice in addition to a full dissertation. Much like the UK, in Canada, the DBA is a full academic doctorate that can only be granted by Universities Canada-accredited institutions and shares equal parity with a PhD (Management). The dissertation to be completed as part of a DBA program differs only in focus but not in breadth of study, nor academic rigour required. DBA programs in Canadian institutions must include an original contribution to knowledge which must be chaired (supervised) by an accomplished researcher and orally defended (viva) to internal and external examiners.

Structure and format
Doctor of Business Administration programs have a dual purpose: contribute to business theory and further develop the professional practice (e.g. contribute to professional knowledge in business). Universities generally require candidates to have significant experience in business, particularly in roles with leadership or other strategic responsibilities. DBA candidates specialize in areas such as management science, information technology management, organizational behavior, economics, finance, and the like. As with other doctorate programs, curricula may be offered on a full-time or part-time basis. According to the European higher education standards set by the Bologna Process, the normal duration of research doctorate programs like the DBA and PhD is usually 3–4 years of full-time study.

The responsibility for the structure of doctoral programs resides within the graduate research committees or their equivalent within the university. As such, DBA programs have a specific set of university regulations and are subject to quality approval processes. Regulations include references to protocols for treating ethical issues in research. These regulations are widely used in Australian Universities. For instance, a DBA student cannot embark on the research phase before passing all his or her coursework. Furthermore, upon passing the proposal stage, he or she must clear ethics-related issues with an Ethics Committee. These candidates must go through numerous internal moderations of the dissertation before submitting to external examinations (usually at least two). Successful candidates usually revise their dissertations numerous times before final approval is granted from the doctoral committee.

Relationship between DBA and PhD
In the United States, Doctor of Business Administration and Doctor of Philosophy in Business Administration are equivalent degrees. Also, both doctorates are viewed as research doctorates representing the highest academic qualification in business. As such, both DBA and PhD programs require students to develop original research leading to a dissertation defense. Furthermore, both doctorates enable holders to become faculty members at academic institutions. The DBA and PhD in Business Administration are terminal degrees, allowing the recipient to obtain a tenure-track position in the United States; other countries' requirements may differ.

In some cases, the distinction is solely administrative (Harvard Business School was not authorized to issue a PhD until 2018) In other cases, the distinction is one of orientation and intended outcomes. The PhD is highly focused on developing original academic knowledge, while the DBA emphasizes applied research. Upon completion, graduates of PhD programs generally migrate to full-time faculty positions in academia, while those of DBA programs re-emerge in industry as applied researchers or executives. If working full-time in industry, graduates of DBA and PhD programs often become adjunct professors in top undergraduate and graduate degree programs.

Notable persons with a DBA degree

 Alfred Sant – Former Prime Minister of the Republic of Malta and former leader of the Maltese Labour Party
 Hugh T. Broomall – Major General, USAF, Special Assistant to the Director, Air National Guard
 Robert F. Bruner – Dean Charles C. Abbott Professor of Business Administration and Distinguished Professor of Business Administration at the Darden Graduate School of Business Administration, University of Virginia
 Clayton M. Christensen – Robert and Jane Cizik Professor of Business Administration at Harvard Business School
 Scott Cowen – president of Tulane University of Louisiana
 Nigel Healey – vice chancellor of Fiji National University
Yoko Ishikura - Chief Digital Officer, Japanese Cabinet
Shrikant Jichkar - Indian civil servant and politician
Omobola Johnson - Nigerian technocrat
 Manfred F.R. Kets de Vries – Raoul de Vitry d'Avaucourt Professor of Leadership Development at INSEAD and director of the INSEAD Global Leadership Centre
 Tony Newton - President and Board Chair, British Dental Health Foundation and International Dental Health Foundation Durham University Business School
 CK Prahalad – Paul and Ruth McCracken Distinguished University Professor of Corporate Strategy at University of Michigan, Ross School of Business
 John Quelch – Dean, Vice President and Distinguished Professor of International Management at CEIBS, previously Senior Associate Dean and the Lincoln Filene Professor of Business Administration at Harvard Business School
 Michael E. Raynor – Canadian management expert and consultant with Deloitte Consulting LLP, the Distinguished Fellow with Deloitte Research
Lenos Trigeorgis – Real options pioneer; Professor of finance, University of Cyprus
 David Arnold Wagner - Cognitive Dissonance Researcher and Leadership Instructor  Trident University International
 Birger Wernerfelt – J. C. Penney Professor of Management and Chair of PhD Committee, MIT Sloan School of Management
 Robert B. Wilson – Adams Distinguished Professor of Management, Emeritus, Graduate School of Business, and Professor of Economics (by courtesy), School of Humanities and Sciences, Stanford University
Dave Yeske – Co-Founder, Managing Director, Yeske Buie; National President (2003), Financial Planning Association (FPA); Distinguished Adjunct Professor, Ageno School of Business, Golden Gate University

See also
 Business Education
 Doctor of Management
 Executive DBA Council
 
 
 PhD in Management
 Master of Business Administration (MBA)

References 

Business Administration
Business qualifications
Management education